The abbreviation UKPS may refer to:

 the United Kingdom Pound sterling (currency);
 the United Kingdom Passport Service, a former government agency;
 UK Public Sector Consulting, a private consultancy company